Novyi Buh is a city in Bashtanka Raion, Mykolaiv Oblast, Bashtanka Raion, Ukraine. It hosts the administration of Novyi Buh urban hromada, one of the hromadas of Ukraine. Population:  In 2001, population was 16,250. The Inhul River Park partly falls within the town.

History
Until 18 July 2020, Novyi Buh was the administrative center of Novyi Buh Raion. In July 2020, as part of the administrative reform of Ukraine, which reduced the number of raions of Mykolaiv Oblast to four, Novyi Buh Raion was merged into Bashtanka Raion., the city was not greatly affected by the Russia-Ukraine war.

References

External links
 The murder of the Jews of Novyi Buh during World War II, at Yad Vashem website.

Cities in Mykolaiv Oblast
Cities of district significance in Ukraine
Populated places established in the Russian Empire
Khersonsky Uyezd
Holocaust locations in Ukraine